Bill Camp is an American actor of the stage and screen.

Filmography

Film

Television

Theatre

References 

Male actor filmographies
American filmographies